Clarence O'Neal Bradford, known as C.O. "Clarence" Bradford (and C.O. "Brad" Bradford during his campaign for Harris Country District Attorney), is a Houston City Council member, a former chief of police of Houston, Texas, and in 2008 an unsuccessful Democratic Party candidate for District Attorney of Harris County, Texas. On November 3, 2009, Bradford was elected to the Houston City Council from At-large Position 4 and took office January 2, 2010. In the 2011 election, Bradford won a second term as a Houston City Councilmember.

Background
Bradford is an attorney, public safety consultant, former Houston Chief of Police and vice mayor pro-tem for the City of Houston. In January 2012, members of the Houston City Council elected Bradford as vice mayor pro-tem via unanimous vote. Bradford ran three successful citywide campaigns, the maximum (three terms) permitted under law. During his second and third campaign, he won in every council district, without a run-off and got the highest number of votes in all of the citywide contested races.

He became a resident of the city of Houston in 1979. Bradford has lived in Hiram Clarke, Alief, Fondren Southwest, and MacGregor areas, he understands the various characteristics of the Houston community and appreciates efforts to focus on neighborhood needs. 
Bradford served 24 years as a Houston police officer and seven years as chief of police. He was appointed Houston's police chief by Mayor Bob Lanier and re-appointed by Mayor Lee P. Brown. While serving as chief of police, Bradford managed 7,000 personnel and $500 million annual budget. During his tenure, citizens' fear of crime and public safety concerns went from 59% in 1996 to only 10% by the time he left office in 2003, as documented by Dr. Stephen Klineberg, Rice University.

He holds degrees in law from the University of Houston Law Center, criminal justice from Grambling State University, and a public administration degree from Texas Southern University. Also, he is a graduate of the FBI Academy and Harvard University's Kennedy School of Government Program for State and Local Executives.

Bradford has combined his education, legal training and police experience to work with neighborhoods and businesses, nationally and internationally, to help develop safety strategies.
He has initiated and led investigations, reviews, and assessments surrounding police, community and incidents of crime on numerous occasions. Bradford was part of the leadership team that first developed and implemented community policing strategies in Houston, Texas. Today, more than 80% of the police agencies in America utilize some form of community policing; it is a proven concept in providing public safety services.

Bradford served one of the longest tenures as a Houston police chief and implemented many significant programs and initiatives during his administration.  These include the department's first alternative dispute resolution process, American Sign Language Program, assessment center process for promotions, expansion of airport security, city/county jail consolidation project, computer crime mapping, crisis intervention team program, decentralized family violence unit, hate crimes program and Houston Police Online.  Bradford also initiated HPD crime laboratory accreditation, the first meet and confer employees’ benefits agreement, established the first Middle Eastern and South Asian community liaison, created the No Trucks in the Left-Lane Motorists Safety Program, implemented a racial profiling prohibition policy, implemented HPD's Top 10 Sex Offenders/Parole Violators Program and created the department's first crime victim services unit.  He also opened new police stations at four divisions and police storefronts at five locations.  In cooperation with 28 other police agencies and media outlets, Bradford implemented the Technology to Recover Abducted Kids (TRAK) System, and he established the first youth police advisory council in the nation.

Bradford has served as a precinct chair and election judge in Harris County, Texas. Also, he has extensive experience as a senior consultant in the international consulting firm of Brown Group International (BGI). BGI is a full-service consulting firm that provides solutions to problems of government, corporations and individuals. BGI offers services in the areas of public safety, homeland security, crisis management, government relations, community government, personnel selection, litigation support, technology services and international trade.
 
Additionally, Bradford has served for several years as an adjunct professor in the School of Public Affairs at Texas Southern University. He is a highly rated professor teaching two particular courses: Police Administration and Judicial Administration.

As a Houston City Council member, Bradford focused on the delivery of core services which include water, garbage, infrastructure issues and safety services. In addition to serving on the Public Safety and Homeland Security Committee, he served as chair of the Ethics, Elections and Council Governance Committee, vice chair of the Budget and Fiscal Affairs Committee and chaired a City of Houston Procurement Process Task Force.

Bradford’s civic activities include serving as a precinct chair, election judge, and deputy voter registrar in Harris County, Texas. He holds memberships and volunteers in numerous community activities, including the ENRICH After-School (Evaluating the Out-of-School-Time Needs, Resources and Initiatives in the Communities of Houston) Houston Livestock Show and Rodeo, Education Foundation of Harris County, American Education Technologies Youth Counselor, Grambling State University's Criminal Justice Advisory Board, Wiley College Criminal Justice Institute, DeVry University Industry Advisory Board, 100 Club, Harris County Constable Precinct 7 Advisory Board and frequently serves as a university guest lecturer, crime prevention and safety awareness speaker.

Education
Bradford holds degrees from the University of Houston Law Center, Grambling State University and Texas Southern University. He is also a graduate of the FBI Academy and the Harvard University Kennedy School of Government.

Career

While chief of police for the Houston Police Department, Bradford held one of the longest tenures in that office. He also has the distinction of being one of only two police chiefs to be appointed by two Houston mayors. Both Mayor Bob Lanier and Mayor Lee Brown selected him as their chief of police. Bradford, an attorney, served 24 years with the Houston Police Department, including seven years as police chief.

During his tenure as police chief, the citizens' fear of crime and public safety concerns went from a high of 59%, constantly downward, to only 10% when he left office, as documented by Dr. Stephen Kleinberg of Rice University.

References

External links
 Clarence Bradford Campaign website.

Houston Police Department chiefs
Year of birth missing (living people)
Living people
People from Houston
Texas Democrats
Harvard Kennedy School alumni
University of Houston alumni
Grambling State University alumni
Texas Southern University alumni